Wheatley is a village and civil parish in Oxfordshire, about  east of Oxford. The parish includes the hamlet of Littleworth, which is immediately to the west of Wheatley village. The 2011 census recorded the parish population as 3,913.

Archaeology
It was excavated in 1845, when Roman coins dating from AD 260 to 378 and fragments of Roman pottery and Roman tiles were found.

Manor
The village had its beginnings in the Anglo-Saxon era. It is in a valley running eastwards, the stream of which flows through the centre of the village to join the River Thame, a tributary of the River Thames. The stream used to be in the open, with stepping stones for people to cross it. However, it is now in a culvert that runs along under the High Street.

In 1883 a Saxon cemetery was excavated, and artefacts removed from it are housed in the Ashmolean Museum in Oxford. In the 13th century Wheatley was part of the property of Abingdon Abbey, and in 1279 was described as a hamlet of Cuddesdon.

Wheatley manor house was enlarged and improved in 1601, and bears an inscription on the front stating T.A. 1601, which stands for Thomas Archdale, the then owner. It still retains its original appearance whereas most of the other old cottages and buildings have been restored.

Churches

The Church of England parish church of St Mary the Virgin was built in the 18th century. Samuel Wilberforce, Bishop of Oxford, disliked the building and had it rebuilt in 1855-1857 to designs by the Oxford Diocesan architect, GE Street. Its tower has a ring of six bells, four of which were cast in 1794 for the 18th-century church. There is also a Russian bell from Troitsa, thought to have been claimed as a spoil of war and given to the church early in the 20th century.

The Congregational church was built in 1842–43 on the site of the former tannery. It is now a United Reformed Church.

Wheatley's Roman Catholic church is Our Lady of Lourdes in Crown Road. It is part of the parish of Corpus Christi, Headington.

Wheatley Community Church is an evangelical church that formed in 2015. It meets weekly in the primary school.

There was an independent church in the old Granary building at 30 Church Road.

All the churches in Wheatley are now in a Local Ecumenical Partnership which also includes the parish church of Saint Bartholomew in Holton.

Economic and social history
One of Wheatley's main industries was quarrying limestone which was used for building Windsor Castle, Merton College, local cottages and ecclesiastical buildings, most of which were erected between the 13th and 18th centuries. Other occupations included faggot cutting and ochre cutting, the ochre being crushed at the windmill which still stands today.

There were two windmills on the hill southwest of the village. One was a post mill that burned down in 1875. The other, Wheatley Mill, is an octagonal tower mill that dates from before 1671. It has been rebuilt and re-equipped a number of times, including in 1763 after a fire and in 1784 when the Eagle Ironworks, Oxford supplied some of the machinery. The tower mill had fallen out of use by 1914, and lightning struck it in 1939.

Wheatley once had ten pubs. A plaque on a gable of the King's Arms in Church Street says that it was built in 1756.

In 1719 the Stokenchurch Turnpike Act turned the main road into a turnpike. Stagecoaches between the Golden Cross in Oxford and London travelled via the Old Road over Shotover Plain to the west of the village. Many of Wheatley's inns had an upper entrance in Church Road and another in the High Street to accommodate the change of horses. The George coaching inn opposite the manor house is now a house with courtyards.

The village lock-up, built in 1834, is a stone building in the shape of a hexagonal pyramid, near the edge of the former quarry. In the 19th century it was used to lock up drunks overnight before sending them to the Oxford court. More recently it has been opened every May Day. For a small charge visitors can be locked up for five minutes or so, and given a certificate to prove it.

British Railways closed the line and Wheatley station in 1963. Kelham Hall Drive and Kimber Close have been built on the site of the station.

Shotover Park was the home of Lt Col Sir John Miller, who was Crown Equerry to Queen Elizabeth II. In 1888 his grandmother gave the building called the Merry Bells to the villagers as a temperance hotel as she was saddened to see so much hardship caused by drunkenness. Today the building houses a public library and is a social centre of the village. Ironically, it now has a licence to serve alcoholic drinks.

In the 20th century the Lady Spencer Churchill teacher training college was built on the north side of Wheatley. In 1976 the college merged with Oxford Polytechnic, which has since become Oxford Brookes University. This Wheatley campus is due to close in 2021 and to be replaced by housing.

In 1990 the M40 extension was completed, giving Wheatley a fast road link to Birmingham.

In 2020 Wheatley was awarded Fairtrade Village status as part of the Fairtrade Town initiative.

Governance
Wheatley has three tiers of local government, at parish, district, and county level: Wheatley Parish Council, South Oxfordshire District Council, and Oxfordshire County Council. Wheatley Parish Council generally meets at the Merry Bells village hall at 89 High Street, and its office is at 89A High Street in the same building.

Wheatley was historically a hamlet in the parish of Cuddesdon, which was part of Bullingdon Hundred. Wheatley gradually gained its independence from Cuddesdon, having its own chapel by 1427, appointing its own church wardens by the sixteenth century, and finally being made a separate parish in 1854. From 1835 Wheatley was included in the Headington Poor Law Union.

The parish of Wheatley was made a local board district on 4 November 1857, with a local board established to look after public health and local government. Under the Local Government Act 1894, local boards became urban districts on 31 December 1894. Wheatley was relatively small for an urban district, with its population by 1931 only having reached 1,268 people. Wheatley Urban District was abolished under a County Review Order, with the area becoming part of Bullingdon Rural District on 1 April 1932. Wheatley Parish Council was established at the same time. Bullingdon Rural District in turn was abolished in 1974, becoming part of South Oxfordshire.

Amenities
Wheatley has a Church of England county primary school and a County Council secondary school.

Wheatley has regular bus services. Oxford Bus Company route 46 links Wheatley and Littleworth with Oxford via Horspath and Cowley, and also with Great Milton. Oxford Bus Company route U1 links Wheatley with Harcourt Hill via Oxford. Arriva Beds & Bucks routes 280 and X8 link Wheatley with Oxford via Headington, and with Aylesbury via Thame and Haddenham.

Wheatley has a post office, an Asda superstore with a petrol filling station, a Co-Op pharmacy, several shops in the High Street, and numerous village societies, including the Wheatley Society and a Village Produce Association which holds an annual show.

Wheatley has a few pubs, including:
 The Cricketers Arms, Littleworth
 The King's Arms, Church Road
 The King and Queen, High Street
 The Sun Cafe + Bar, Church Road

Wheatley has a Rugby Union Football Club that with two senior teams. Its First XV plays in the Berks/Bucks & Oxon Premier League. The club also offers junior rugby from ages seven onwards.

References

Bibliography

External links

Wheatley Parish Council
Wheatley Village Archive
Oxford Brookes University

Civil parishes in Oxfordshire
South Oxfordshire District
Villages in Oxfordshire